The Free-minded Liberal Party was a political party in Norway founded in 1909 by the conservative-liberal faction of the Liberal Party. The party cooperated closely with the Conservative Party and participated in several short-lived governments, including two headed by Free-minded Prime Ministers. In the 1930s the party changed its name to the Free-minded People's Party and initiated cooperation with nationalist groups. The party contested its last election in 1936, and was not reorganised in 1945.

History
The Free-minded Liberal Party was founded in March 1909 under influence of Norway's first independent Prime Minister, Christian Michelsen of the Liberal Party, after around a third of the Liberal parliamentary representatives had been excluded from a reconstitution of the Liberal Party in 1908. The party was founded in protest against the increasingly radical course of the "consolidated" Liberal Party, which the party's right wing considered to conflict with the party's traditionally liberal ideology. Other co-founders of the party included Abraham Berge, Wollert Konow (SB), Sofus Arctander, Harald Bothner, Magnus Halvorsen, Ernst Sars, Ola Thommessen and Fridtjof Nansen.

The party initiated a close cooperation with the Conservative Party, and won 23 seats in the 1909 parliamentary election, after which the party formed a government together with the Conservatives with Wollert Konow  as Prime Minister. The government did however not live up to the expectations of either Michelsen or the Conservatives, and the Conservatives withdrew from the government in 1911. Konow's government came to an abrupt end in early 1912 after he declared his sympathies for the rural language form Landsmål in a speech to the Agrarian Youth Association, during the height of the Norwegian language conflict. The speech caused an uproar among militant Riksmål-supporters, especially among the Conservatives, but also in his own party, eventually leading to Konow's replacement as Prime Minister (by Conservative Jens Bratlie).

Notably individualist in orientation, the party emphasised intellectual freedom. The first woman meeting as a parliamentary representative in Norwegian history was the Free-minded's Anna Rogstad in 1911, two years before full suffrage for women was granted in Norway. The conflicts around Konow's failed government caused a major defeat for the Conservative-Free-minded alliance in the 1912 election, and reduced the Free-minded to insignificance with only four seats. The party organisation was increasingly merged into the Conservative organisation after 1912, until election gains and coalition victories in 1921 and 1924 sparked desires for a more independent party. The conflict resulted in numerous name-changes of the various Conservative local and regional chapters in attempts to signal a broader conservative-liberal profile.

The two parties participated in several governments together in the 1920s, until they started drifting increasingly apart towards the end of the decade. In 1931, the Free-minded changed their name to the Free-minded People's Party, and was subsequently reduced to a single representative from Trondheim in the 1933 election. It contested its last election in 1936 in electoral cooperations with the Fatherland League and Nasjonal Samling (NS), failing to secure a single seat. By then most of the local and regional chapters had returned to or joined the Conservatives. The party was not reorganised in 1945.

The first non-Labour Prime Minister after the war, John Lyng, was a member of the party before he joined the Conservatives in 1938. Historian and journalist Hans Fredrik Dahl has described the Progress Party as a spiritual successor to the party.

Party leaders
The party leaders were Abraham Berge (1909–1910), Magnus Halvorsen (1910–1912), William Martin Nygaard (1912–1915), Erik Enge (1915–1918), Bernt Holtsmark (1918–1922), Oluf Christian Müller (1922–1924), Karl Wefring (1924–1925), P. A. Holm (1925–1930), Anton Wilhelm Brøgger (acting, 1930–1931) Einar Greve (1931–1933), Rolf Thommessen (1933–1936), Rudolf Ræder (1936–1937) and Trygve Swensen (1937–1939).

Election results

 * Results from joint lists with the Conservative Party. Vote indicated here is shared between the parties, while seats indicated represent the Free-minded Liberal Party's share alone (including seats won by the party on separate lists).
 ** Results from separate lists of the Free-minded Liberal Party, contested in some constituencies. 
 *** Results from joint lists with the Fatherland League and Nasjonal Samling.

References

 
Political parties established in 1909
1909 establishments in Norway
Political parties disestablished in 1945
1945 disestablishments in Norway
Liberal parties in Norway
National liberal parties
Defunct political parties in Norway
Conservative liberal parties